Ted Richards may refer to 

 Ted Richards (American football) (1901 – 1978), American football player
 Ted Richards (artist) (born 1946), web designer and cartoonist
 Ted Richards (born 1983), Australian rules footballer

See also
 Richards (surname)
 Edward Richards (disambiguation)